"The Box It Came In" is a song written by Vic McAlpin (1918-1980) that was recorded by American country, rock, and Christian artist, Wanda Jackson.

The song was recorded at the Columbia Recording Studio on September 24, 1965, in Nashville, Tennessee, United States. "The Box It Came In" was officially released as a single in January 1966, peaking at number eighteen on the Billboard Magazine Hot Country Singles chart. The song became Jackson's first major hit on the country songs chart since 1961 and started a series of charting Billboard country singles between 1966 and 1971. "The Box It Came In" was issued on Jackson's 1966 studio album, Reckless Love Affair.

Chart performance

References 

1966 singles
Wanda Jackson songs
Song recordings produced by Ken Nelson (American record producer)
1965 songs
Capitol Records singles